Auriac is a commune in the Corrèze department in the Nouvelle-Aquitaine region of central France.

The inhabitants of the commune are known as Auriacois or Auriacoises.

Geography

Auriac is located in the Massif Central on the left bank of the Dordogne some 50 km east of Brive-la-Gaillarde and 30 km south by south-east of Égletons. The D13 road from Bassignac-le-Haut to Saint-Merd-de-Lapleau passes through the north-western corner of the commune. The D65 branches off the D13 in the commune and goes south-east to the village then continues south-east to join the D145 just west of Rilhac-Xaintrie. The D111 branches from the D65 south of the village and goes to Saint-Julien-aux-Bois in the south. The D72 branches from the D111 in the south of the commune and goes north-west to Bassignac-le-Haut with the D75 branching off it in the commune and going to Servières-le-Château in the south-west. Apart from the village there are the hamlets of La Vedrenne, Anjoux, Le Mons, Dezejouls, Chadirac, Selves, Job, Lalo, Labouldoire, Verchapie, and Rigieix. About 60% of the land area is forested with the rest farmland.

The Dordogne river forms the entire northern border of the commune with many streams rising in the commune and flowing north to join it including the Ruisseau de la Cascade with its tributary the Ruisseau de Selves, the Ruisseau de Murat, the Ruisseau des Bialles, and the Ruisseau de Valette with its tributaries the Ruisseau de Longuechaux and the Ruisseau de Courpou which forms much of the south-eastern border.

Neighbouring communes and villages

Toponymy
Old forms of the name Auriac come from a Latin man's name Aureus which was Auriaco in 1105.

History

Auriac has been inhabited since prehistory

In the 12th century Stephen of Obazine and Cistercian monks from Obazine Abbey founded the Abbey of la Valette in Auriac. The construction of the Barrage de Chastang from 1947-1952 resulted in the submersion of the remains of the Abbey.

In the 13th century the Benedictine Abbey of Saint-Géraud of Aurillac established a priory in the commune with the Prior having the right of high justice with a chateau of which there are remains of the Keep still standing.

Heraldry

Administration

List of Successive Mayors

Demography
In 2017 the commune had 229 inhabitants.

Economy
Salers cattle are raised in the commune.

Local culture and heritage

Civil heritage
Camping at the artificial lake
Redenat Waterfall
A Tumulus at Puy-de-Valette
The Menhir of Selves
A House near the remains of the Keep which was the home of the former Prior.
Panoramic view at Puy-du-Bassin
The Dordogne Valley.
The Confluence of the Luzège.

Since 2013 there has been a Natural Heritage Interpretation path which leads to the top of the Xaintrie at Puy du Bassin from the town centre.

Religious heritage

The remains of the abbey of Valletta from the 12th century are submerged in the lake behind the Chastang Dam.
The Chapel of Puy du Bassin (at an altitude of 707 m)
A Church (15th-16th century)
The Chapel Dézéjouls (19th century).
The Chapel Notre-Dame-de-Chastres at Cours (19th century).
A Monumental granite cross (19th century).
A Wayside Cross (15th century).
The Church of Saint-Côme Saint-Damien (12th century), which was the former priory, is registered as a historical monument. The church contains two items which are registered as historical objects:
A Collection plate: the Annunciation (16th century)
A Eucharistic Cross (17th century)

See also
Communes of the Corrèze department

References

External links
Auriac official website 
Auriac on Géoportail, National Geographic Institute (IGN) website 
Auriac on the 1750 Cassini Map

Communes of Corrèze